Hydnocarpus wrayi is a species of plant in the Achariaceae family. It is found in Peninsular Malaysia and Borneo.

References

wrayi
Trees of Peninsular Malaysia
Trees of Borneo